Coke usually refers to:
 Coca-Cola, a brand of soft drink
The Coca-Cola Company
 Slang term for cocaine, a psychoactive substance and illicit drug

Substances

Soft drinks
Cola, any soft drink similar to Coca-Cola
Generic name for a soft drink

Other substances
 Coke (fuel), a solid carbonaceous residue derived from the destructive distillation of coal
 Petroleum coke, a solid, carbon-rich residue derived from the distillation of crude oil

People
 Coke (surname), a list of people
 Koch (surname), a variant of the surname, may also be pronounced "coke"
 Coke (footballer) (b. 1987), real name Jorge Andújar Moreno, Spanish footballer
 Coke Escovedo (1941–1986), American percussionist
 Coke Reed (b. 1940), American mathematician
 Coke R. Stevenson (1888–1975), Governor of Texas from 1941 to 1947

Other uses
 Coke (album), 1975 album by Coke Escovedo
 Coke County, Texas, a county in central Texas, United States
 COKE (programming language), a FOCAL-based programming language
 Antonov An-24, transport aircraft NATO reporting name

See also
 
 
 Coke Studio (disambiguation)
 Koch (disambiguation)
 Koke (disambiguation)